Mystical Nativity may refer to:

The Mystical Nativity by Sandro Botticelli, 1500-01
 Mystical Nativity (Filippo Lippi) or Adoration in the Forest, by Filippo Lippi, c. 1569